Stereos are a Canadian pop band from Edmonton, Alberta, formed in 2008. Their musical style fuses aspects of electronic music, rock, and pop. Their breakout came from appearing on the MuchMusic original series, disBAND. In October 2009, they released their debut self-titled album, Stereos.

Biography

2008–2009: Early days and record deal
The band formed roughly two years prior to its 2008 appearance on disBAND under the name Stand By Me.  After meeting disBAND Guru Greig Nori, Stand By Me was advised to change their name due to copyright issues. Turn It Up was chosen. Later, in order to perform several shows in Toronto, Ontario, Universal Music Canada A&R rep Mark Spicoluk advised the band to change their name again, and the band chose the name Stereos. After receiving the thumbs up from the judges from disBand, Stereos went to a large gig to receive a contract from the President of Universal Music Canada and judged by Kiss member Gene Simmons.

On June 4 their music video for "Summer Girl" debuted on the MuchMusic Countdown. The single also debuted at #2 on the Canadian Hot 100 based on the large number of downloads in the first week and in June 2009, Stereos' debut single, "Summer Girl" sold over 120,000 units in Canada and has been certified CRIA double platinum in digital downloads. The band released their self-titled debut album Stereos on October 20, 2009 and was certified gold by the CRIA in January 2010 with sales of over 40,000 copies. The band started their first ever Cross-Canada tour on November 7, 2009 in Windsor, Ontario.

2010–2011: The Show Must Go...On The Road Tour and second studio album
Stereos went across Canada in March and April 2010 on Hedley's The Show Must Go...On The Road Tour. Hedley announced the tour in support of their new album The Show Must Go which was released November 17, 2009. "Fefe Dobson and Stereos were along for the whole trek, while Faber Drive and Boys Like Girls joined on select dates."

In March 2010, the band received two Juno Award nominations which were for Best New Artist, and Best Pop Album. They released two other singles that charted moderately,"Turn It Up" peaked at #31, and "Butterflies" at #51. The song "She Only Likes Me When She's Drunk" failed to chart.

Stereos' second album, titled "Uncontrollable" was released on December 14, 2010. The first single from the album, "Uncontrollable" was released on October 25, 2010 and peaked at #42 on the Canadian Hot 100. The second single,"Body Move" was released in February 2011, just before their cross Canada tour. In mid April the band's drummer, Aaron, sustained a broken hand, leaving him unable to perform, causing the band to cancel their remaining shows.

2019–present: 10-Year Reunion and Return from hiatus
On March 10, 2019, Stereos announced a 10-year reunion show to take place on May 11, 2019, at Toronto's Rec Room during Canadian Music Week on their Facebook page, which ended up selling out. A second 10-year reunion show in the band's hometown of Edmonton took place on August 16, 2019 and also sold out. On October 20, 2019, the band announced they were officially back in the studio recording new material. On February 3, 2020, the band announced via their social media pages that they would be releasing a brand new single, titled "Sunset Gold" which was released on February 28, 2020.

In 2023, they participated in an all-star recording of Serena Ryder's single "What I Wouldn't Do", which was released as a charity single to benefit Kids Help Phone's Feel Out Loud campaign for youth mental health.

Discography

Studio albums

Singles

Promotional singles

Other charted songs

Music videos
"Summer Girl" — 2009
"Throw Ya Hands Up" — 2009
"Turn It Up" — 2009
"Butterflies" — 2010
"Wingin' It Theme" — 2010
"She Only Likes Me When She's Drunk" — 2010
"Uncontrollable" — 2010
"Body Move" — 2011

References

External links

Stereos at Twitter

Musical groups established in 2008
Musical groups from Edmonton
Canadian pop music groups
2008 establishments in Alberta
Musical groups disestablished in 2012
Musical groups reestablished in 2019
2012 disestablishments in Alberta